Vakijvari is a village in the Ozurgeti Municipality of Guria in western Georgia. Vakijvari is officially recognized as resort place by Government of Georgia.

References

Populated places in Ozurgeti Municipality